is a professional Japanese baseball player.

External links

 NPB.com

1990 births
Living people
Baseball people from Ōita Prefecture
Japanese baseball players
Nippon Professional Baseball pitchers
Tokyo Yakult Swallows players
Fukuoka SoftBank Hawks players